Mark XII or Mark 12 often refers to the twelfth version of a product, frequently military hardware. "Mark", meaning "model" or "variant", can be abbreviated "Mk." 

Mark XII or Mark 12 can specifically refer to:

In technology

In military and weaponry
 BL 6 inch Mk XII naval gun, a British naval gun
 MK-3-12 (1907), a Russian naval main weapon that used three 12-inch guns in a single mounting
 Mark 12 torpedo (1930), an American 21-inch torpedo
 5"/38 caliber gun or Mark 12 5"/38 (1934), a widely used American 5-inch naval gun
 18 inch Mark XII torpedo (1935), a British 18 inch torpedo
 Supermarine Spitfire Mk XII (1942–1944); the first Griffon-engined Spitfire variant
 Hawker Hurricane Mk XII (1942), a Canadian-built Hurricane variant
 Gloster Meteor Mk XII, a British night fighter variant with American radar
 21-inch Mark 12 (1952), a British torpedo
 Mark 12 nuclear bomb (1954–1962), an American nuclear bomb
 Colt Mk 12 cannon, a US Navy aircraft gun used in the 1950s and 1960s
 Mk 12 Special Purpose Rifle (2002), a weapon system in use by United States Special Operations Forces

Other technology
 Sumlock ANITA calculator Mk 12 (1966), a Sumlock ANITA desktop model

Other uses
 Mark 12 or Mark XII, the twelfth chapter of the Gospel of Mark in the New Testament of the Christian Bible
 Vox Mark XII, a 12-string variant of the Vox Mark electric guitar made in the 1960s
 MK12, a graphic design company